Petar Mišić (born 24 July 1994) is a Croatian professional footballer who plays for Bosnian Premier League club Tuzla City.

Honours
Dinamo Zagreb
1. HNL: 2014–15
Croatian Cup: 2014–15

References

External links
 

1994 births
Living people
People from Bruchsal
Sportspeople from Vinkovci
Association football wingers
Croatian footballers
Croatia youth international footballers
Croatia under-21 international footballers
HNK Cibalia players
GNK Dinamo Zagreb players
NK Lokomotiva Zagreb players
NK Slaven Belupo players
RNK Split players
FC Aarau players
FK Tuzla City players
Croatian Football League players
Swiss Challenge League players
Premier League of Bosnia and Herzegovina players
Croatian expatriate footballers
Expatriate footballers in Switzerland
Croatian expatriate sportspeople in Switzerland
Expatriate footballers in Bosnia and Herzegovina
Croatian expatriate sportspeople in Bosnia and Herzegovina